The Society for Developmental Biology (SDB), originally the Society for the Study of Development and Growth, is a professional society for scientists and professionals around the world whose research is focused on the study of the developmental biology, embryology, and related disciplines.

History 
SDB was founded in 1939 as the “Society for the Study of Development and Growth”. SDB’s first meeting, a symposium on Development and Growth, was held in a small village schoolhouse in North Truro, Massachusetts in August 1939. For each session, a lecture or presentation on a single topic was chosen, and the remainder of the time was spent on discussion. The Society was organized as a result of the success of that first meeting.  In 1965, the organization was renamed the “Society for Development Biology” to reflect SDB’s promotion of the field of developmental biology and advancement of the understanding of developmental biology at all levels.

Mission 
The Society for Developmental Biology employs an inclusive philosophy to further the study of developmental biology and related disciplines; to foster, support, and provide a forum for all investigators in these fields; to educate non-specialists, educators, the general public, and policymakers about developmental biology and related disciplines; and to promote fair, respectful, ethical and equitable practices throughout the scientific enterprise.

SDB seeks to:

 Foster excellence in research and education in developmental biology and related areas.
 Organize scientific meetings, workshops, and courses that focus on developmental biology and related areas.
 Provide resources on careers and professional development in developmental biology and related fields.
 Provide information for the public on relevant topics in developmental biology.
 Serve as a communication hub for all developmental biologists worldwide.

Membership 
SDB has more than 2,000 members and provides an international forum for research, education, and career development in developmental biology. Membership is open to all with discounted rates for students, postdoctoral researchers, and affiliates. SDB offers grants to help defray the costs of educational projects and meetings organized by its members. SDB Emerging Research Organisms Grant supports the development of techniques, approaches, community resources, collaborations, and new lines of research to study developmental mechanisms in non-traditional systems.

Awards 
SDB Career Awards recognize excellence in research, mentoring, education, and science communication in the developmental biology community.

 Edwin Grant Conklin Medal recognizes extraordinary mentorship and research contributions to the field. The award was inaugurated in 1995 to honor the biologist Edwin Conklin.
 Developmental Biology-SDB Lifetime Achievement Award, which began in 2000, recognizes outstanding and sustained contributions to the field through research, service to the scientific community, exceptional mentorship, and public advocacy.
 Viktor Hamburger Outstanding Educator Prize recognizes innovative contributions to the teaching and learning of developmental biology and related fields.
 Elizabeth D. Hay New Investigator Award recognizes a new investigator performing outstanding research in developmental biology.
 SDB Trainee Science Communication Award recognizes great science communication and outreach efforts by the student and postdoctoral members.

Meetings 
SDB organizes meetings and conferences, including the annual meeting and 6 to 8 regional meetings. More information about future and past meetings is posted on SDB's official website .

Publication 
SDB publishes in a monthly peer reviewed journal, Developmental Biology.

References

External links 
Society for Developmental Biology home page
Developmental Biology journal home page

Developmental biology
Scientific societies based in the United States
Scientific organizations established in 1939